Colonel Carl Jonas Wærn (23July 1915 – 6November 2003) was a Swedish Army officer who led Swedish, Irish, and Indian peacekeeping troops in the Congo Crisis. He also commanded Swedish forces on Cyprus in 1964. Later, he served as adjutant to Gustaf VI Adolf of Sweden.

Early life
Wærn was born on 23 July 1915 in Spånga, Sweden, the son of lawyer Olof Wærn and the journalist Gerd Ribbing (née Rehn). He passed studentexamen in 1934.

Career

Military career
Wærn became a reserve officer in 1936 and an officer in 1940. He was commissioned as an officer into Värmland Regiment (I 2) in 1941. During World War II he served as a ranger platoon leader at the Norway–Sweden border. He attended the Royal Swedish Army Staff College in 1947 and was deputy military attaché in Copenhagen in 1948 and was second teacher at the Swedish Infantry Combat School the same year. Wærn attended the School of Infantry in Warminster, England in 1950 and served at Värmland Regiment (I 2) in 1951. Wærn served at the Army Staff in 1955 and at Västerbotten Regiment (I 20) in 1956 and became major the same year. He was first teacher at Infantry Combat School in 1957 and the same year he was appointed adjutant to Gustaf VI Adolf of Sweden.

He was a colonel and commander of the twelfth and fourteenth Swedish UN battalion in Congo from 1961 to 1962. At the same time, he was brigade commander of the Swedish, Indian and Irish troops in southern Katanga, which was part of the United Nations Operation in the Congo (ONUC) from June 1961 to May 1962. Wærn was the section chief of the IV Military Commanding Staff in 1962 and was commander of the Swedish UN Battalion in Cyprus in 1964, part of the United Nations Peacekeeping Force in Cyprus (UNFICYP). He was infantry commander of the Stockholm Coastal Artillery Defense (Stockholms kustartilleriförsvar) in 1966.

Later life
Wærn was a member of the Samfundet SHT and of the Charles John Association (Karl Johans förbundet). In 1974 he was appointed cabinet chamberlain. Wærn continue to be active at the court as governor of Gripsholm Castle and Strömsholm Palace from 1975 to 1983. In 1976 he received a Bachelor of Arts degree. In spring 1998, the TV program Röda rummet did a viewing poll about the century's most significant Swedish books. Wærn's book about Katanga was placed in 84th place out of 100 titles.

Personal life
In 1939, Wærn married the royal housekeeper Lissie Ehnström (1916–2012), the daughter of Axel Ehnström and Stina Larsdotter. He was the father of Stina (born 1942), Olof (born 1944), Peder (born 1950) and Lotta (born 1957). Wærn died on 6 November 2003 and was buried on 12 December 2003 in the family grave at Norra begravningsplatsen in Solna Municipality.

Awards and decorations

Swedish
  King Gustaf VI Adolf's Commemorative Medal (29 August 1967)
  Knight of the Order of the Sword (1958)
  Knight of the Order of Vasa
  Home Guard Medal of Merit in gold
 Värmland Officers Association's Silver Medal (Värmlands befälsförbunds silvermedalj)
 Army Shooting Medal (Arméns skyttemedalj)

Foreign
  Officer of the Legion of Honour
  United Nations Medal (ONUC; Congo)
  United Nations Medal (UNFICYP; Cyprus)
  United Nations Emergency Force Medal
 Italian Red Cross' Silver Medal

Bibliography

References

External links
Interview with colonel Jonas Wærn 

1915 births
2003 deaths
Swedish Army colonels
Military personnel from Stockholm
People of the Congo Crisis
Knights of the Order of the Sword
Burials at Norra begravningsplatsen